is the sixth studio album by Japanese singer Yōko Oginome. Produced by Masao Urino and released through Victor Entertainment on July 16, 1987, the album features the hit singles "Wangan Taiyōzoku" and "Sayonara no Kajitsutachi", the latter being her first No. 1 single. Route 246 Connexion is a concept album themed around Japan National Route 246. A karaoke version of the album was released on September 1, 1987. The album was reissued on April 21, 2010 with seven bonus tracks as part of Oginome's 25th anniversary celebration. 

The album peaked at No. 2 on Oricon's albums chart and sold over 274,000 copies.

Track listing

Charts
Weekly charts

Year-end charts

References

External links
 
 
  

1987 albums
Yōko Oginome albums
Japanese-language albums
Concept albums
Victor Entertainment albums

ja:246コネクション